Give It to Me or Give It 2 Me may refer to:

 Give It to Me (album) or the title song, by Sistar, 2013

Songs
 "Give It to Me" (Mobb Deep song), 2006
 "Give It to Me" (Timbaland song), 2007
 "Give It to Me" (The J. Geils Band song), 1973
 "Give It to Me" (The Troggs song), 1967
 "Give It 2 Me", by Madonna, 2008
 "I Just Wanna Love U (Give It 2 Me)", by Jay-Z, 2000
 "Give It to Me", by 2PM from Hands Up, 2011
 "Give It to Me", by 3 Doors Down from 3 Doors Down, 2008
 "Give It to Me", by Jason Derulo from Future History, 2011
 "Give It to Me", by Kylie Minogue from Fever, 2001
 "Give It to Me", by The Maine from Black & White, 2010
 "Give It to Me", by Patricia Paay, 1980
 "Give It to Me", by The Pioneers, 1968
 "Give It to Me", by Sheryl Crow from Feels Like Home, 2013
 "Give It to Me", by Sơn Tùng M-TP featuring Snoop Dogg, 2019
 "Give It to Me", by Stranger Cole, 1969
 "Give It to Me", by The Whispers from Just Gets Better with Time, 1987
 "Give It to Me", from the musical Let My People Come, 1974
 "Give It 2 Me", by Edem
 "Give It 2 Me", by Shihan featuring Propaganda, 2005
 "Give It 2 Me", by Shinhwa, 2015

See also
 "Give It to Me Baby", a 1981 song by Rick James
 "Give It to Me Right", a 2009 song by Melanie Fiona
 "Give It Up to Me", a 2009 song by Shakira
 "(When You Gonna) Give It Up to Me", a 2006 song by Sean Paul